The discography of American rapper and record producer Timbaland consists of 3 studio albums, 16 singles, and 11 music videos.

Albums

Studio albums

Mixtapes

Singles

As lead artist

As featured artist

Promotional singles

Other charted songs

Guest appearances

Music videos

As lead artist

As featured artist

As songwriter

As producer

See also 
 Timbaland's production discography
 Timbaland & Magoo discography

Notes

References 

Discography
Discographies of American artists
Hip hop discographies